Sidney Jackson Wyche  ( February 11, 1922 – November 11, 1983) was an American songwriter and pianist. Wyche is best known for writing the jazz standard "Alright, Okay, You Win", Elvis Presley's Billboard Hot 100 chart-topper "A Big Hunk o' Love", and the Jackie Wilson hits "A Woman, a Lover, a Friend" and "Talk That Talk".

References

External links
http://longlivethemusic.blogspot.com/2006/11/who-is-sid-wyche_116238862498176340.html

1922 births
1983 deaths
Musicians from Virginia
20th-century American composers
Songwriters from Virginia
African-American composers
20th-century African-American musicians